Wang Hung-hsiang (born 7 April 1981) is a Taiwanese professional pool player, nicknamed "the Master." During the 2006 WPA Men's World Nine-ball Championship he survived the group stages and the round of 64, but was eliminated in the round of 32 by Wu Chia-ching.

On September 21, 2008, Dennis Orcollo defeated Hung-hsiang 11-9 to win the Guinness 9-ball Tour championship in Guangzhou, China (WPA Asian Nine-ball Tour).

References

Living people
Year of birth missing (living people)
Taiwanese pool players
Place of birth missing (living people)